Imperial Japanese Navy ship classifications went through various changes between 1871 and 1945, as technology changed and new ship classes were added while those that became obsolete were discontinued.  There were efforts to translate some ships' classes that were imported or in use by other navies, while incorporating any classification system into Japanese language conventions and maintaining an internal consistency.

Classification terminology
These were legal classifications of the naval vessels of the Imperial Japanese Navy. Therefore, those names are different from universal classifications and class names.

In laws, ordinances, regulations, and policies pertaining to the Imperial Japanese Navy, there were no classifications related to the light aircraft carrier, escort carrier, heavy cruiser or light cruiser.  Even if it is assumed that these translation were different in the Japanese language, there could be the same phrase and class in English language, and vice versa.
Example 1: Kōsakukan (工作艦) and Kōsakusen (工作船) = Repair ship.
Example 2: Fusetukan (敷設艦), Fusetsusen (敷設船), and Fusetsutei (敷設艇) = Minelayer.

The suffix of ship classes could also relate the type or structure of the vessel, which may carry a slightly different connotation than the translated English term.  SOme examples: 
-kan (艦) = Vessel or Ship, example: Kōsakukan is Repair vessel; Senkan is a Battleship.
-sen (船) = Ship, example: Kōsakusen is Repair ship.
-tei (艇) = Boat, example: Fusetsutei is Mine boat.

Representative classification tables

28 October 1871 (Initial)
28 October 1871, Rules of the Navy, and officer's salary schedules, Article 3 and 4, Ministry of War (明治4年10月28日 兵部省 海軍規則並諸官俸給表 第3條および第4條, 1871 Kaigun kisoku narabini shokan hōkyūhyō)

5 October 1872
5 October 1872, Revision of the Naval ship classes (明治5年10月4日 海軍省軍務局 艦船等級更正ノ件, 1872 Kansen tōkyū kōsei-no ken)

13 August 1890
13 August 1890, Notice No. 291, "Naval ships ordinance, Article 2", Minister's Secretariat (明治23年8月13日 海軍大臣官房 達第291号 海軍艦船籍條例 第2條, 1890 Kaigun kansenseki jōrei)

1 April 1896
1896 Imperial edict No. 71, "Naval ships ordinance, Article 3" (明治29年 勅令第71号 海軍艦船條例 第3條, 1896 Chokurei Dai-71-gō, Kaigun kansen jōrei)

21 March 1898
Standard classifications of the naval warships and torpedo boats (海軍軍艦及水雷艇類別標準, Kaigun gunkan oyobi suiraitei ruibetsu-hyōjun)

22 June 1900
Standard classifications of the naval vessels (海軍艦艇類別標準, Kaigun kantei ruibetsu-hyōjun)

28 August 1912
Standard classifications of the naval vessels

17 May 1916
Standard classifications of the naval vessels

1 April 1920
Standard classifications of the naval vessels

Standard classifications of the naval auxiliary vessels (海軍特務艦艇類別標準, Kaigun tokumu-kantei ruibetsu-hyōjun)

1 December 1924
Standard classifications of the naval vessels

Standard classifications of the naval auxiliary vessels

2 March 1927
Standard classifications of the naval vessels

Standard classifications of the naval auxiliary vessels

30 May 1931
Standard classifications of the naval vessels

Standard classifications of the naval auxiliary vessels

26 June 1941
Standard classifications of the naval vessels

Standard classifications of the naval auxiliary vessels

30 June 1945 (Final)
Standard classifications of the naval vessels

Standard classifications of the naval auxiliary vessels

Detailed classification tables

Battleship

Battlecruiser

Cruiser

Aircraft carrier

Seaplane tender

Dispatch vessel

Torpedo boat tender/Submarine tender

Minelaying ship/Minelayer/Rapid extension netlayer

Note; pertinence of rapid extension netlayer was only .

Training battleship

Note; pertinence of training battleship was only . She does not return to battleship in the Imperial Japanese Navy's official documents.

Training cruiser

Note; pertinence of training cruiser was only .

Coast defence ship

Gunboat

Torpedo boat destroyer/Destroyer

Submersible/Submarine

Note; Kō-hyōteki, Kairyū and Kaiten were not included in this table, because they were weapons in the Imperial Japanese Navy's official documents.

Torpedo boat

Mine boat/Capture-net layer

Note; pertinence of capture net layer was only .

Auxiliary minelayer

Cable layer

Note; pertinence of cable layer was only .

Minesweeper

Auxiliary minesweeper

Submarine chaser

Auxiliary submarine chaser

Patrol boat

Auxiliary patrol boat

Landing ship

Note 1; pertinence of 1st class landing ship was only . 
Note 2; pertinence of 2nd class lamding ship was only .

Motor torpedo boat

Coast defence boat

Note; there is not a ship classed on this table. All  and  vessels were incomplete.

Repair ship/Repair vessel

Transport vessel/Transport ship

Note; Included replenishment oiler (給油船/給油艦, Kyūyusen/Kyūyukan), collier (給炭船/給炭艦, Kyūtansen/Kyūtankan), collier-oiler (給炭油艦, Kyūtan'yukan), munition ship (給兵艦, Kyūheikan), food supply ship (給糧艦, Kyūryōkan) and freighter (雑用艦, Zatsuyōkan).

Hospital ship
Note; there is not a ship classed on this table.

Icebreaker

Note; pertinence of icebreaker was only .

Survey ship

Target ship
This section treats a self-propelled target ship. Towed target ship is miscellaneous ship.

Auxiliary training ship

Submarine depot boat

Appendix

Miscellaneous ship

17 September 1903 (Initial)
17 September 1903, Notice No. 90, Quorum and kinds of miscellaneous ship in naval units, Minister's Secretariat, Ministry of the Navy (明治36年9月17日 海軍大臣官房 達第90号 海軍各廳附属雑役船ノ種類及定数, 1903 Tatsu Dai-90-Gō, Kaigun kakuchō fuzoku zatsuekisen-no shurui oyobi teisū)

Converted merchant ship classification tables

23 December 1916 (Initial)
23 December 1916, Ministerial ordinance No. 281, Special service ships and units ordinance, Minister's Secretariat, Ministry of the Navy (大正5年12月23日 海軍大臣官房 内令第281号 特設艦船部隊令, 1916 Nairei Dai-281-Gō, Tokusetsukansen butairei)

February 1945 (Final)
February 1945, Ministerial ordinance No. 83, Special service ships and units ordinance, Minister's Secretariat, Ministry of the Navy (昭和20年2月 海軍大臣官房 内令第83号, 1945 Nairei Dai-83-Gō)

Footnotes

See also
Japanese ship-naming conventions
List of ships of the Imperial Japanese Navy
List of Japanese Navy ships and war vessels in World War II

Bibliography 
Summary of Naval military commands, Naval Minister's Secretariat/Ministry of the Navy
Vol. 1, April 1936 (24th supplement, March 1945)
Vol. 3, April 1936 (24th supplement, March 1945)
Series 100 year histories from Meiji Era, Ministry of the Navy, printed by Hara Shobō (Japan)
Vol. 172, Histories of Naval organizations #2, original plot in 1941, reprint in March 1971
Vol. 173, Histories of Naval organizations #3 (1), original plot in 1939, reprint in May 1971
Vol. 174, Histories of Naval organizations #3 (2), original plot in 1939, reprint in July 1971
Vol. 180, Histories of Naval organizations #8, original plot in January 1940, reprint in October 1971
 The Maru Special, Ushio Shobō (Japan)
 Japanese Naval Vessels No. 25, "Japanese seaplane tenders w/ auxiliary seaplane tenders", March 1979
 Japanese Naval Vessels No. 29, "Japanese submarine tenders w/ auxiliary submarine tenders", July 1979
 Japanese Naval Vessels No. 34, "Japanese auxiliary vessels", December 1979
 Japanese Naval Vessels No. 39, "Japanese torpedo boats", May 1980
 Japanese Naval Vessels No. 42, "Japanese minelayers", August 1980
 Japanese Naval Vessels No. 45, "Japanese gunboats", November 1980
 Japanese Naval Vessels No. 47, "Japanese minewarfare crafts", January 1981
 Japanese Naval Vessels No. 49, "Japanese submarine chasers and patrol boats", March 1981
 Japanese Naval Vessels No. 50, "Japanese minesweepers and landing ships", April 1981
 Japanese Naval Vessels No. 53, "Japanese support vessels", July 1981
 Japanese Naval Vessels No. 132, "Japanese submarines I", February 1988
 Japanese Naval Vessels No. 133, "Japanese submarines II", March 1988
 Japanese Naval Vessels No. 134, "Japanese submarines III", April 1988
 Japanese Naval Vessels No. 135, "Japanese submarines IV", May 1988
Monthly Ships of the World,  (Japan)
No. 391, Special issue Vol. 24, "Japanese battleships", March 1988
No. 441, Special issue Vol. 32, "Japanese cruisers", September 1991
No. 453, Special issue Vol. 34, "History of Japanese destroyers", July 1992
No. 469, Special issue Vol. 37, "History of Japanese submarines", August 1993
No. 481, Special issue Vol. 40, "History of Japanese aircraft carriers", May 1994
No. 500, Special issue Vol. 44, "Ships of the Imperial Japanese Navy", August 1995
No. 507, Special issue Vol. 45, "Escort Vessels of the Imperial Japanese Navy", February 1996
No. 522, Special issue Vol. 47, "Auxiliary Vessels of the Imperial Japanese Navy", March 1997
No. 681, Special issue Vol. 79, "History of Japanese battleships", October 2007
No. 736, Special issue Vol. 95, "History of Japanese aircraft carriers", January 2011
No. 754, Special issue Vol. 101, "History of Japanese cruisers", January 2012
, National Archives of Japan
Reference code: A03020231100, Original script signed by the Emperor / Imperial ordinance No.71 of 1896 /Abolition of Naval ships ordinance established in and Warship ordinance
Reference code: A03020647600, The script signed by the Emperor, 1905, Imperial Ordinance No.258, Amendment and addition to the Naval Warships and Other Vessels Ordinance.
Reference code: A08072692000, Classification standard table of warship and special service vessels
Reference code: C08050092300, Classification table of special naval ships (1)
Reference code: C09090196000, Messages of Council of State inquiry to Seiin about Navy rules and salary table
Reference code: C09110630100, Jurisdiction Vessels rank correction caused by proclamation
1/700 Water Line Series Guide Book of Imperial Japanese Navy ships, Shizuoka Plastic Model Manufacturers Association (Aoshima Bunka Kyozai/Tamiya Corporation/Hasegawa Corporation), October 2007

Imperial Japanese Navy
Naval history of Japan
Ships of the Imperial Japanese Navy
Legal history of Japan